Arved Birnbaum (1962 – 24 October 2021) was a German actor most known to audiences worldwide as Max Riemelt's down to earth senior in Dennis Gansel's vampire thriller/drama We Are The Night. He played over 60 roles in film and television since 1999.

Filmography

References

External links
 
 

1962 births
2021 deaths
People from Forst (Lausitz)
People from Bezirk Cottbus
German male television actors